Chikhali is a village in Ahmedpur taluka of Latur district, Maharashtra.

References

Latur district